Jiří Zástěra (9 November 1913 – 15 August 1983) was a football player and manager. He made 198 appearances in the Czechoslovak First League, scoring three goals. He played three matches for Czechoslovakia. As a manager, Zástěra led numerous teams. He led ATK Prague to an eighth-place finish in 1948. He later won the 1959–60 Czechoslovak First League with Spartak Hradec Králové.

References

External links 

1913 births
1983 deaths
People from Skuteč
People from the Kingdom of Bohemia
Czech footballers
Czechoslovak footballers
Czechoslovakia international footballers
Association football defenders
AC Sparta Prague players
Czech football managers
Czechoslovak football managers
Dukla Prague managers
FC Hradec Králové managers
Sportspeople from the Pardubice Region